"Band of Gold" is a song written and composed by former Motown producers Holland–Dozier–Holland (under the pseudonym of Edythe Wayne) and Ron Dunbar. It was a major hit when first recorded by Freda Payne in 1970 for the Invictus label, owned by H-D-H. The song has been recorded by numerous artists, notably competing 1986 versions by contrasting pop singers Belinda Carlisle and Bonnie Tyler, and a 2007 version by Kimberley Locke.

The legendary songwriting team of Holland–Dozier–Holland used the name Edythe Wayne because of a lawsuit in which they were embroiled with Motown. Ron Dunbar was a staff employee and producer for Invictus. When they first offered the song to Freda Payne, she balked at the idea of recording it, finding the material more appropriate for a teenager or very young woman while she was nearly 30 years old. Payne reluctantly gave in after much persuasion by Dunbar. Almost immediately following its release, the Payne record became an instant pop smash, reaching number three in the US, where it was certified Gold by the RIAA and number one on the UK singles chart, where it remained at the top spot for six weeks in September 1970.

After Holland-Dozier-Holland left Motown in 1967, they were still in contact with Motown's house band, the Funk Brothers and when they started their own recording company, with the intention of self-producing the songs they wrote, they asked the Funk Brothers to play on those songs.

Golden World/Motown session singers Pamela Vincent, Joyce Vincent Wilson, and Telma Hopkins provided the background vocals on the record. Joyce and Telma would later go on to form the group Tony Orlando & Dawn. Also singing in the background is Freda Payne's sister and future member of the Supremes, Scherrie Payne, who was also signed to Invictus at the time as a member of the Glass House group.

The distinctive electric sitar part is played by Dennis Coffey. The lead guitar on the selection is performed by Ray Parker Jr., who later headed the team Raydio before becoming a solo recording artist in his own right.

In 2004, Freda Payne's "Band of Gold" was voted number 391 in Rolling Stone magazine's listing of the 500 Greatest Songs of All Time.

Topic and controversy
The song tells a story which is open to a number of interpretations – based on the lyrics in the most commonly heard version of the song, which is the seven-inch single, the story is of a recently married woman whose husband is incapable of loving her (even though he tried), resulting in the couple sleeping in separate rooms on their honeymoon, to her dismay. It would appear that the marriage ended in the husband's abandoning his bride, leaving her with no more than the "band of gold" of the title (and the dreams she invested in it). Allusions to the husband either being impotent or gay have been suggested as the cause of the breakdown of the relationship. Steve Huey's article on Allmusic.com deciphers the song as being about the man being impotent – "being unable to perform".

An earlier studio recorded version of the song includes some lyrics which were cut from the seven-inch single, which reveal the story as somewhat different. The couple were young, the girl was either a virgin or sexually inexperienced. She was still living at home ("You took me from the shelter of my mother"), the boy was her first boyfriend ("I had never known or loved any other"), and the relationship was probably unconsummated ("and love me like you tried before"). The couple rush into marriage and the relationship crashes on the wedding night, when the woman rejects her groom's advance ("And the night I turned you away”)  emotionally wounding him, resulting in him leaving her. After the hurt she had caused, they spend their wedding night in separate rooms. She then expresses her regret at her mistake ("And the dream of what love could be, if you were still here with me").

According to Ron Dunbar, when interviewed in the documentary Band of Gold – The Invictus Story, he encouraged Payne to learn the lyrics to the song despite her reluctance, Payne saying "this makes no sense to me." Dunbar told her, "you don't have to like it, just sing it!" Dunbar continues: "I dubbed that tune 25, maybe 30 times just to get enough parts of it that we could edit to get the song."

Dunbar continued: "They said this song is a smash in the gay community. And I said, gay community? They said, yeah man, it's a smash. And I says, why is it that? And they said, well it's what the lyrics are saying. She said the guy couldn't make love to her so they figured he had to be gay! And I said oh no! And I remembered when they said that to me and I listened back to the song and there was a part in there... because I remembered when we were editing that tune, it was too long, so we had to cut a section out of the tune so the section we cut out of the song really brought the whole song [story] together."

The lyrics which Dunbar cut in the final edit which he was referring to were made to reduce the length of the single from three minutes 43 seconds down to the final two minutes 53 seconds. These were taken from the first verse – "And the memories of our wedding day, and the night I turned you away" – these were effectively substituted with, "And the memories of what love could be, if you were still here with me"; and a larger bridge – "Each night, I lie awake and I tell myself, the vows we made gave you the right, to have a love each night."  – which is repeated again later in the song, cutting 18 seconds twice over from the song. With further refinements in the arrangements, including a heavier, richer bassline, and a different vocal take, a further 14 seconds were shaved off the final released seven-inch single.

Other versions
In November 1980, "Band of Gold" featured on the EP by "The Reels"; "Five Great Gift Ideas from The Reels", side 2, track 3 on the Mercury label. It is a catchy and interesting synthpop interpretation. The EP reached number 12 on the Australian charts (Kent music Report). 
In 1983, "Band of Gold" was recorded by disco/hi-NRG singer Sylvester on Megatone Records and released as a 12" single. Sylvester's version reached number 18 on the Billboard Hot Dance Club Play chart and number67 on the UK Singles Chart.
Also in 1983, country singer Charly McClain recorded a country version of "Band of Gold" for her album The Woman in Me. McClain's version reached number 22 on the Billboard Hot Country Singles chart in June 1984.
In 1986, both Belinda Carlisle and Bonnie Tyler released their cover versions of "Band of Gold". Despite both coming off major hits and working with noted musicians, neither the Carlisle nor Bonnie Tyler versions were especially commercially successful.
 Tyler's "Band of Gold" cover was produced by Jim Steinman, the man behind earlier hits by Tyler and Meat Loaf, and later hits by Celine Dion, and the track was given a slew of Hi-NRG remixes.  The song was the third single off Tyler's Secret Dreams and Forbidden Fire, which also features the hit "Holding Out for a Hero".  This version of "Band of Gold" reached number 81 in the UK, and did not chart elsewhere.
Carlisle's version was originally included on her Belinda album, but was revised for single release with Freda Payne adding prominent backing vocals. This newly-cut take on "Band of Gold" was a very minor hit in Canada, reaching number 91, but did not chart nationally elsewhere.  Dance remixes of this track (also featuring vocals by Payne) met with some success on the US club scene.
In September 2005, singer-songwriter Anna Nalick recorded "Band of Gold". Nalick would perform the song live, despite the fact that it would not appear on any of her studio efforts. It was later included for release as part of the Desperate Housewives soundtrack (Music from and Inspired by Desperate Housewives).
Kimberley Locke released her version of "Band of Gold" to radio on August 13, 2007, as the second single from her album Based on a True Story. It became Locke's second single to hit number one on Billboards Hot Dance Club Play chart and her seventh to go top 10 on the Hot Adult Contemporary Tracks chart. In December 2009, Billboard included Kimberley's version of the song at number 45 on their list of the top 50 Dance Club Play songs of the decade. Locke had previously performed the song alongside Frenchie Davis during "Hollywood week" on the second season of American Idol, and later performed it again during her final performance week on the show.

Track listings and formats (Locke version)

US remixes maxi single – CURBD-2062
 "Band of Gold" (Dave Audé radio edit) – 3:12
 "Band of Gold" (Bimbo Jones radio edit) – 3:22
 "Band of Gold" (Almighty radio edit) – 2:57
 "Band of Gold" (Scotty K radio edit) – 3:49
 "Band of Gold" (Dave Audé Mixshow edit) – 6:06
 "Band of Gold" (Bimbo Jones mix) – 7:17
 "Band of Gold" (Almighty extended mix) – 6:51
 "Band of Gold" (Scotty K extended Klub mix) – 6:45
 "Band of Gold" (Dave Audé club mix) – 8:25
 "Band of Gold" (Dave Audé dub) – 7:08

UK promotional remixes maxi single – Almighty remixes
 "Band of Gold" (Almighty radio mix) – 2:55
 "Band of Gold" (Almighty 12" club mix) – 6:49
 "Band of Gold" (Almighty 12" dub) – 6:38
 "Band of Gold" (Almighty 12" instrumental) – 6:47

An additional remix by Piper was later released in the digital remix package for Locke's next single, "Fall".,                                         •. "Band of Gold" was also recorded by Boris Gardiner in 1970, in Jamaica on the Dynamic records Label-(DYN 404-B)- produced by Byron Lee.

Personnel

Freda Payne version
Lead vocals by Freda Payne
Backing vocals by Scherrie Payne, Telma Hopkins, Joyce Vincent Wilson, and Pamela Vincent
Instrumentation by the Funk Brothers and others
Bass: Bob Babbitt
Guitars: Eddie Willis, Ray Monette, and Ray Parker Jr.
Keyboards: Earl Van Dyke
Drums: Uriel Jones
Percussion: Jack Ashford
Electric sitar: Dennis Coffey

Charts

Weekly charts

Freda Payne version

Bonnie Tyler version

Belinda Carlisle version

Kimberley Locke version

Year-end charts

Freda Payne version

Certifications

Freda Payne version

See also
 List of number-one singles of 1970 (UK)
 Number-one dance hits of 2008 (USA)

References

External links
 

1970 singles
1983 singles
1986 singles
2007 singles
1970 songs
Belinda Carlisle songs
Bonnie Tyler songs
CBS Records singles
Charly McClain songs
Columbia Records singles
Curb Records singles
Epic Records singles
Freda Payne songs
I.R.S. Records singles
Irish Singles Chart number-one singles
Kimberley Locke songs
Song recordings produced by Brian Holland
Song recordings produced by Lamont Dozier
Song recordings produced by Michael Lloyd
Song recordings produced by Mike Curb
Songs about marriage
Songs written by Holland–Dozier–Holland
Songs written by Ron Dunbar
Soul songs
Sylvester (singer) songs
UK Singles Chart number-one singles